Carl Gustav Thulin, 9 October 1845 - 25 March 1918) was a Swedish shipowner. He co-owned and later became the sole owner of the shipping company Nordström & Thulin. He was the son of Anders Thulin och Charlotta Thulin. In 1861 he was employed at the age of sixteen by ship broker Carl David Nordström at a firm that since 1850 had worked with cargoing ships in Stockholm. In 1866 Thulin became co-owner of the company that was called Nordström & Thulin. That same year the company bought its first own ship.

References

1845 births
1918 deaths
19th-century Swedish businesspeople
Swedish businesspeople in shipping
Shipping companies of Sweden
Economic history of Sweden
Place of birth missing